The Mexico men's national field hockey team represents Mexico in international field hockey competitions.

Tournament history

Summer Olympics
 1968 – 16th place
 1972 – 16th place

Pan American Games
 1967 – 6th place
 1971 – 
 1975 – 
 1979 – 
 1983 – 5th place
 1987 – 7th place
 1999 – 7th place
 2011 – 6th place
 2015 – 6th place
 2019 – 7th place

Pan American Cup

Central American and Caribbean Games
 1982 – 
 1986 – 
 1990 – 
 1993 – 
 1998 – 
 2002 – 
 2006 – 4th place
 2010 – 
 2014 – 
 2018 – 
 2023 – Qualified

Pan American Challenge
2021 –

Hockey World League
 2012–13 – Round 1
 2014–15 – 35th place
 2017–17 – Round 1

FIH Hockey Series
 2018–19 – Second round

See also
Mexico women's national field hockey team

References

External links
FIH profile

Americas men's national field hockey teams
Field hockey
Men's sport in Mexico
national team